Greatest Hits of All Times – Remix '88 is a remix album by Boney M. released in 1988. Boney M.'s new manager at the time, Simon Napier-Bell, succeeded in persuading the four original members to briefly reunite and promote this remix album. The man employed to re-arrange the original hits and create new interest in the band was PWL's Pete Hammond, who previously had remixed many of the Stock Aitken Waterman stable's chart-topping hits with Kylie Minogue, Jason Donovan, Rick Astley and Bananarama. Five of the tracks also feature new lead vocals by Liz Mitchell due to losing some of the original recordings. The remix project spun off three fairly successful single releases, "Rivers of Babylon (Remix '88)", "Rasputin (Remix '88)" and the 1988 "Megamix", which would appear on the follow-up album issued a year later, and created the first wave of Boney M. nostalgia in Europe.

While producer Frank Farian has continued to release new recordings under the name Boney M. over the years, such as 1990 non-album single "Stories" (featuring both Liz Mitchell and Reggie Tsiboe) and the four new recordings on compilation More Gold – 20 Super Hits Vol. II in 1993, Greatest Hits of All Times – Remix '88 was in fact the final album project to involve all four of the original Boney M. members; Marcia Barrett, Bobby Farrell, Liz Mitchell and Maizie Williams.

Track listing
"Sunny" (Bobby Hebb) – 3:43 
"Daddy Cool" (Farian, Reyam) – 3:33 
"Rasputin" (Farian, Jay, Reyam) – 5:27 
"Ma Baker" (Farian, Jay, Reyam) – 4:42 
"Take the Heat off Me" (Bigazzi) – 3:53 
"Hooray! Hooray! It's a Holi-Holiday" (Farian, Jay) – 3:23 
"Rivers of Babylon" (Farian, Reyam) – 3:44 
"No Woman, No Cry" (Vincent Ford, Bob Marley) – 3:36 
"Brown Girl in the Ring" (Farian) – 4:01 
"Gotta Go Home" (Farian, Jay, Klinkhammer) – 4:40 
"Painter Man" (Phillips, Pickett) – 3:49 
"Mary's Boy Child/Oh My Lord" (Jester Hairston, Farian, Jay, Lorin) – 4:22

Personnel
Musicians
 Liz Mitchell – lead vocals (tracks 1, 2, 6, 7, 8, 9, 11, 12), backing vocals
 Marcia Barrett – lead vocals (track 5), backing vocals
 Frank Farian – lead vocals, backing vocals

Production
 Frank Farian – producer
 Pete Hammond – remixer
 A PWL Production
 Recorded at PWL Studios London

Single releases
UK
7"
 "Megamix" (Radio Edit) – 3:54 / "Mary's Boy Child/Oh My Lord" (Remix '88) – 4:22 (Ariola Records 111 947, 1988)
 "Rasputin" (Remix '88 – Radio Edit) – 4:08 / "Megamix" (Radio Edit) – 3:54 (Ariola Records 112 096, 1989)

12"
 "Megamix" (Extended Version) – 7:02 / "Rivers Of Babylon" (Remix '88) – 3:40 / "Mary's Boy Child/Oh My Lord" (Remix '88) - 4:22 (Ariola Records 611 947 BB, 1988)
 "Rasputin" (Remix '88) – 5:25 / "Megamix" (Extended Version) – 7:02 (Ariola Records 612 096 BB, 1989)

Germany
7"
 "Rivers of Babylon" (Remix '88) – 3:43 / "Mary's Boy Child/Oh My Lord" (Remix '88) – 4:22 (Hansa Records 111 825-100, 1988)
 "Megamix" (Radio Edit) – 3:54 / "Rasputin" (Remix '88 – Radio Edit) – 4:08 (Hansa Records 111 973-100, 1988)

12"
 "Rivers of Babylon" (Acid House Mix) – 7:15 / "Mary's Boy Child/Oh My Lord (Remix '88) – 4:22 / "Rivers of Babylon" (Remix '88) – 3:43 (Hansa Records 611 825-213, 1988)
 "Megamix" (Extended Version) – 7:02 / "Rasputin" (Remix '88) – 5:25 / "Megamix" (Radio Edit) – 3:54 (Hansa Records 611 973-213, 1988)

CD
 "Rivers of Babylon" (Acid House Mix) – 7:15 / "Mary's Boy Child/Oh My Lord (Remix '88) – 4:22 / "Rivers of Babylon" (Remix '88) – 3:43 (Hansa Records 661 825-211, 1988)
 "Megamix" (Extended Version) – 7:02 / "Rasputin" (Remix '88) – 5:25 / "Megamix" (Radio Edit) – 3:54 (Hansa Records 661 973-211, 1988)

Charts

References

Albums produced by Frank Farian
1988 remix albums
Boney M. remix albums
Hansa Records compilation albums